The Otto and Verdell Rutherford House is a historic building in Portland, Oregon, United States. Otto Rutherford (1911–2000) and Verdell Burdine Rutherford (1913–2001) were leaders in the civil rights movement in Oregon, importantly as president (Otto, from 1952 to 1954) and secretary (Verdell, from the late 1940s through 1962) of the NAACP Portland branch. Their house became a center of meeting, organization, planning, and publishing in support of the African American community's struggle for equal rights. A notable success came with passage of the 1953 Oregon Public Accommodations Act, attributable in large measure to the Rutherfords' work.

The house, built around 1905, was bought in 1923 by William H. and Lottie Rutherford, Otto's parents. It was located in the Albina district, the only place in Portland where the elder Rutherfords could purchase due to exclusionary redlining. Otto and Verdell Rutherford married and moved into the house in 1936. It was entered on the National Register of Historic Places in 2015.

See also
National Register of Historic Places listings in Northeast Portland, Oregon
Fair-Rutherford and Rutherford Houses, homes in the extended Rutherford family in Columbia, South Carolina

References

External links
Oregon Historic Sites Database entry

African-American history in Portland, Oregon
Houses completed in 1905
1905 establishments in Oregon
Houses on the National Register of Historic Places in Portland, Oregon
King, Portland, Oregon
Portland Historic Landmarks